The Sun Radio Interferometer Space Experiment (SunRISE), is a set of CubeSats designed to study solar activity by acting as an aperture synthesis radio telescope. It is intended to monitor giant solar particle storms.

The satellites will occupy a supersynchronous geosynchronous Earth orbit.

The participants in the experiment include JPL, the University of Colorado Boulder and the University of Michigan. It is due to be launched in 2024.

References 

Satellite constellations
Radio telescopes
Space telescopes

Interferometric telescopes